The Orby Baronetcy, of Croyland in the County of Lincoln, was a title in the Baronetage of England.  It was created on 9 October 1658 for Thomas Orby. The title became extinct on the death of the third Baronet in 1725.

Orby baronets, of Croyland (1658)
Sir Thomas Orby, 1st Baronet (died )
Sir Charles Orby, 2nd Baronet (c. 1640–c. 1716)
Sir Thomas Orby, 3rd Baronet (c. 1658–1725)

References

Extinct baronetcies in the Baronetage of England